Springfield is a city in Effingham County, Georgia, United States. The population was 2,852 at the 2010 census, up from 1,821 in 2000. The city is the county seat of Effingham County. Springfield is part of the Savannah Metropolitan Statistical Area.

History
Springfield was established in 1799, and most likely was named after a plantation. The Georgia General Assembly incorporated Springfield in 1838.

Geography
Springfield is located in central Effingham County at  (32.368240, -81.310152). Georgia State Route 21 bypasses the city center on the west, while Route 119 passes closer to the center of town.

Demographics

2020 census

As of the 2020 United States census, there were 2,703 people, 1,392 households, and 857 families residing in the city.

2010 census
As of the 2010 United States Census, there were 2,852 people living in the city. The racial makeup of the city was 66.3% White, 28.6% Black, 0.6% Native American, 0.4% Asian, 0.1% Pacific Islander, 0.1% from some other race and 1.2% from two or more races. 2.8% were Hispanic or Latino of any race.

2000 census
As of the census of 2000, there were 1,821 people, 633 households, and 453 families living in the city. The racial makeup of the city was 76.28% White, 22.13% African American, 0.38% Native American, 0.05% Asian, 0.11% Pacific Islander, 0.77% from other races, and 0.27% from two or more races. Hispanic or Latino of any race were 2.03% of the population.

There were 633 households, out of which 36.2% had children under the age of 18 living with them, 51.0% were married couples living together, 17.4% had a female householder with no husband present, and 28.3% were non-families. 25.6% of all households were made up of individuals, and 11.5% had someone living alone who was 65 years of age or older.  The average household size was 2.48 and the average family size was 2.97.

In the city, the population was spread out, with 24.1% under the age of 18, 9.7% from 18 to 24, 30.2% from 25 to 44, 18.9% from 45 to 64, and 17.1% who were 65 years of age or older.  The median age was 36 years. For every 100 females, there were 96.7 males.  For every 100 females age 18 and over, there were 93.8 males.

The median income for a household in the city was $36,544, and the median income for a family was $41,071. Males had a median income of $35,096 versus $25,192 for females. The per capita income for the city was $16,519.  About 11.1% of families and 13.4% of the population were below the poverty line, including 17.4% of those under age 18 and 8.6% of those age 65 or over.

Education

Effingham County School District 
The Effingham County School District holds pre-school to grade twelve, and consists of eight elementary schools, three middle schools,  and two high schools. The district has 511 full-time teachers and over 9,037 students.
Blandford Elementary School
Ebenezer Elementary School
Guyton Elementary School
Marlow Elementary School
Rincon Elementary School
Sand Hill Elementary School
South Effingham Elementary School
Springfield Elementary School
Ebenezer Middle School
Effingham County Middle School
South Effingham Middle School
Effingham County High School
South Effingham High School

Notable people
Paul Carrington - professional football player
Charlton W. Tebeau - historian
Artie Ulmer - professional football player
Dusty Zeigler - professional football player
Josh Reddick -  professional baseball player

References

External links
 
City of Springfield official website
Springfield at CityData.com

Cities in Georgia (U.S. state)
Cities in Effingham County, Georgia
County seats in Georgia (U.S. state)
Savannah metropolitan area